Monona County is a county located in the U.S. state of Iowa. As of the 2020 census, the population was 8,751. The county seat is Onawa.

History
The area around present-day Onawa was a stopping point in 1804 for Meriwether Lewis and William Clark during their exploration of the newly obtained Louisiana Purchase. Many years later, that site was memorialized as the Lewis and Clark State Park.

Monona County was formed in 1851. It was perhaps named for an Indian word meaning "beautiful valley."

Monona County was organized officially in the spring of 1854 having been a part of Benton County (every county west of Benton in a line) in 1851 and afterwards Harrison County between 1852 and 1854.

When Ashton (originally called Bloomfield) was named the county seat in the fall of 1854, a log house served as the first courthouse. Ashton remained the county seat for only four years. That designation was moved to Onawa on April 5, 1858, and the first Monona County Courthouse was completed that same year.

Geography

Major highways
 Interstate 29
 Iowa Highway 37
 Iowa Highway 141
 Iowa Highway 175
 Iowa Highway 183

Adjacent counties
Woodbury County (north)
Crawford County (east)
Harrison County (south)
Burt County, Nebraska (southwest)
Thurston County, Nebraska (west)

Demographics

2020 census
There were 4,373 housing units, of which 3,839 were occupied.

2010 census
There were 4,697 housing units, of which 4,050 were occupied.

2000 census

As of the census of 2000, there were 10,020 people, 4,211 households, and 2,737 families residing in the county. The population density was 14 people per square mile (6/km2). There were 4,660 housing units at an average density of 7 per square mile (3/km2). The racial makeup of the county was 98.34% White, 0.08% Black or African American, 0.76% Native American, 0.12% Asian, 0.04% Pacific Islander, 0.08% from other races, and 0.58% from two or more races. 0.70% of the population were Hispanic or Latino of any race.

There were 4,211 households, out of which 26.70% had children under the age of 18 living with them, 54.50% were married couples living together, 7.10% had a female householder with no husband present, and 35.00% were non-families. 31.00% of all households were made up of individuals, and 17.50% had someone living alone who was 65 years of age or older. The average household size was 2.31 and the average family size was 2.88.

In the county, the population was spread out, with 23.20% under the age of 18, 6.20% from 18 to 24, 23.30% from 25 to 44, 23.30% from 45 to 64, and 23.90% who were 65 years of age or older. The median age was 43 years. For every 100 females, there were 94.20 males. For every 100 females age 18 and over, there were 90.50 males.

The median income for a household in the county was $33,235, and the median income for a family was $41,172. Males had a median income of $27,349 versus $19,607 for females. The per capita income for the county was $17,477.  About 6.60% of families and 9.40% of the population were below the poverty line, including 8.90% of those under age 18 and 9.50% of those age 65 or over.

Communities

Blencoe
Castana
Mapleton
Moorhead
Onawa
Rodney
Soldier
Turin
Ute
Whiting

Unincorporated communities
Ticonic

Townships

 Ashton
 Belvidere
 Center
 Cooper
 Fairview
 Franklin
 Grant
 Jordan
 Kennebec
 Lake
 Lincoln
 Maple
 St. Clair
 Sherman
 Sioux
 Soldier
 Spring Valley
 West Fork
 Willow

Population ranking
The population ranking of the following table is based on the 2020 census of Monona County.

† county seat

Politics
For over a century, Monona County was close to a national bellwether. Between 1900 & 2004, it only failed to back the national winner in 1960 & 1988. However, this bellwether status no longer applies. Barack Obama failed to carry the county in both of his electoral victories statewide & nationally, while Donald Trump in 2020 earned the highest percentage of any candidate since Franklin D. Roosevelt in 1932, in spite of his unsuccessful reelection bid.

See also

Monona County Courthouse
National Register of Historic Places listings in Monona County, Iowa
Blackbird Bend

References

External links

Discover Monona County Portal style website, The Communities, Recreation and more
Monona County website

 
1851 establishments in Iowa
Iowa counties on the Missouri River
Populated places established in 1851